The 1939 Northwestern Wildcats team represented Northwestern University during the 1939 Big Ten Conference football season. In their fifth year under head coach Pappy Waldorf, the Wildcats compiled a 3–4–1 record (3–2–1 against Big Ten Conference opponents) and finished in fifth place in the Big Ten Conference.

Schedule

References

Northwestern
Northwestern Wildcats football seasons
Northwestern Wildcats football